Vivek Maddala is a four-time Emmy-winning composer who focuses on writing music for feature films, theater and dance productions, and television. He is known for composing music scores for independent movies such as Kaboom, Highway, and the Peabody-winning American Revolutionary: The Evolution of Grace Lee Boggs, as well as for silent film restorations for Turner Classic Movies, including a 90-minute score for the Greta Garbo film The Mysterious Lady (2002). Additionally, Maddala writes, produces, and performs as a multi-instrumentalist with various recording artists. He is a Sundance Lab Fellow  for film composition, and has had work premiere at the Cannes, Toronto, Berlin, and Sundance film festivals.  Maddala has received six Emmy nominations, with four wins, in the category of "Outstanding Music Direction and Composition."

Personal life
Vivek Maddala is the son of economist G. S. Maddala. He began playing music at age 3 and later studied jazz performance at the Berklee College of Music. He earned degrees in electrical engineering from the Georgia Institute of Technology and pursued graduate studies at the University of Washington.

Awards
Grand Prize winner of the Young Film Composers Competition
ASCAP Film Scoring Fellowship
JPFolks Soundtrack Album of the Year for The Patsy
Gold Medals at the Park City Film Music Festival for Wild Oranges, They Turned Our Desert Into Fire and Grasshopper
BMI Conducting Fellowship
 2010 Council of Outstanding Young Engineering Alumni
 2014 Hollywood Music in Media Awards (nomination), Best Score – Documentary
 2017 Daytime Emmy Awards (nomination), Outstanding Music Direction and Composition
 2018 Daytime Emmy Awards (win), Outstanding Music Direction and Composition
 2019 Annie Award (nomination), Outstanding Achievement for Music in an Animated Television/Broadcast Production
 2019 Daytime Emmy Awards (win), Outstanding Music Direction and Composition
 2020 Annie Award (nomination), Outstanding Achievement for Music in an Animated Television/Broadcast Production
 2020 Daytime Emmy Awards (win), Outstanding Music Direction and Composition
 2021 Daytime Emmy Awards (win), Outstanding Music Direction and Composition
 2022 Children's and Family Emmy Awards (nomination), Outstanding Music Direction and Composition
 2022 Hollywood Music in Media Awards (nomination), Best Score – Streamed Animated Film

References

External links

American film score composers
American film people of Indian descent
Living people
Georgia Tech alumni
University of Washington alumni
American male musicians of Indian descent
American musicians of Indian descent
Writers from Gainesville, Florida
Musicians from Gainesville, Florida
American male film score composers
1973 births